Oupalam is a legislative assembly constituency in the Union territory of Puducherry in India.
 Oupalam assembly constituency was part of Puducherry (Lok Sabha constituency).

Members of the Legislative Assembly

Election results

2021

See also
List of constituencies of the Puducherry Legislative Assembly
Puducherry district

References 

 

Assembly constituencies of Puducherry